Maguy Nestoret (born 28 July 1969 in Vitry-sur-Seine, France) is a French athlete who specialises in the 200 metres. Nestoret competed in the women's 200 m at the 1992 Summer Olympics where she took fifth in heat three in a time of 24.15 seconds.

She was part of a relay that took fifth in the 4 × 100 metres relay at the 1991 World Championships in Athletics at Tokyo.  She also won three Mediterranean Games gold medals in the 200 m in 1993, the 4 × 100 m relay in 1991 and again in 1993. Maguy won the French national 200 m title in 1993.

National titles
French Athletics Championships
 200 m: 1993
French Indoor Athletics Championships
200 m : 1993

Personal records

References

External links
 

Living people
1969 births
People from Vitry-sur-Seine
French female sprinters
Olympic athletes of France
Athletes (track and field) at the 1992 Summer Olympics
World Athletics Championships athletes for France
Sportspeople from Val-de-Marne
Mediterranean Games gold medalists for France
Mediterranean Games medalists in athletics
Athletes (track and field) at the 1991 Mediterranean Games
Athletes (track and field) at the 1993 Mediterranean Games
Olympic female sprinters